A walk is walking, the main form for animal locomotion on land, distinguished from running and crawling.

Walk or WALK may refer to:

Places
Walk, Livonia, the German name for a town in Livonia
Island Walk, an unincorporated area and a census-designated place (CDP) in Collier County, Florida, United States
Walk Glacier, a glacier in the Jones Mountains, Antarctica

Persons 
Bob Walk (born 1956), American baseball pitcher
Mark Walk, American music composer
Neal Walk (1948–2015), American, National Basketball Association center

Arts, entertainment, and media

Music

Albums and EPs
Walk (album), a 1996 album by Andrew Peterson
Walk (Pantera EPs), a series of EPs by Pantera, 1993
Walk (Kwabs EP), 2014
Walk (Grayson|Reed EP), 2017

Songs
"Walk" (Comethazine song)
"Walk" (Foo Fighters song)
"Walk" (Kwabs song)
"Walk" (Pantera song)
"Walk", a song by Blind Melon from Soup
"Walk", a song by Agnez Mo from her self titled album
"Walk", single by Peakboy
"Walk", single by Saucy Santana
"Walk," a song by The Wiggles from Yummy Yummy
"A Walk", single from the punk rock group Bad Religion

Periodicals
Walk: the Magazine of the Ramblers' Association, a UK walking magazine

Radio stations
WALK-FM, a radio station (97.5 FM) licensed to serve Patchogue, New York, United States
WLID, a radio station (1370 AM) licensed to serve Patchogue, New York, United States, known as WALK from 1952 to 2019
WKAO, a radio station (91.1 FM) licensed to Ashland, Kentucky, United States. One of the 7 Walk FM network of contemporary Christian radio stations based in Ashland, Kentucky, United States

Other uses
Walk (graph theory), in graph theory, an alternating sequence of vertices and edges
Base on balls, also called a walk, in baseball, an award of first base to a batter following four balls being thrown by the pitcher
Battle of Walk, war started on July 8, 1657 between Swedish and Russian forces
Pedestrian crossing#Signalized intersections, also called walks or walkways

See also
The Walk (disambiguation)
Walking (disambiguation)
Wok